Deh Bureh (also Romanized as Deh Būreh; also known as Deh Būr) is a village in Kolyai Rural District, in the Central District of Asadabad County, Hamadan Province, Iran. At the 2006 census, its population was 161, in 40 families.

References 

Populated places in Asadabad County